Jacob (or Jakob) Milich (also Mühlich; January 24, 1501 – November 10, 1559) was a German mathematician, physician and astronomer.

He was born in Freiburg im Breisgau, where he received his education starting in 1513. He studied at Albert-Ludwigs-Universität in Freiburg im Breisgau under Desiderius Erasmus. He taught at Wittenberg, where he received an M.D. degree and became a professor of mathematics. His most important student there was Erasmus Reinhold. Among his works was a 1535 commentary on the second book of Pliny the Elder. He became Dean of the Wittenberg university's philosophical and medical branches, then served as Rector of the school on several occasions. He died in Wittenberg. Jacob Milich had one son. 

The crater Milichius on the Moon is named after him.

References 

1501 births
1559 deaths
16th-century German mathematicians
16th-century German astronomers
16th-century German writers
16th-century German male writers